Elías Blanco Mamani (born 20 July 1962) is a Bolivian journalist, writer, and prolific biographer whose works include the Bolivian Cultural Dictionary which has compiled information on the lives of over 2000 poets, novelists, writers, and other protagonists of Bolivian cultural history. He is the founder and operator of the editorial and museum El Aparapita in La Paz.

Biographical career 
In 1992, he retired from his profession as a journalist in order to dedicate himself fully to the task of meticulously researching, writing, and compiling the biographies of thousands of Bolivian historical authors. Between 2006 and 2011, he published a series on various individuals in Bolivian culture from each of the country's departments as well as Argentina, Chile, and Germany.After 20 years of work, he published his first book Diccionario de Poetas Bolivianos in 2011, which incorporate biographical data as well as select poems, criticisms, and author's thoughts on over 1000 Bolivian poets. The following year, he published the Diccionario de Novelistas Bolivianos, the second volume of the series, which catalogued 491 authors and 918 novels published from 1834 to 2012. 

In order to publish his works, Blanco established the El Aparapita publishing house. An aparapita is an Aymara word which, as translated by Jaime Sáenz, means "the one who carries". Blanco explained that he named the editorial after the term because "In this case, it carries something very heavy: the wealth of information on Bolivian culture". In addition to being an editorial, El Aparapita doubles as a museum and gallery of "forgers of Bolivian culture".

As a complementary feature to this publications, Blanco operates the Diccionario Cultural Boliviano, a blog that compiles these biographies into a digital format. The blog was launched in April 2012 on the same day as the opening of the Aparapita museum. Blanco's stated aim in creating the dictionary was ease of access, especially in regards to research from abroad.

Publications

References

External links 

 Bolivian Cultural Dictionary
 El Aparapita Editorial
Elías Blanco Mamani – YouTube

1962 births
Living people
21st-century Bolivian historians
Bolivian journalists
Bolivian male writers
Higher University of San Andrés alumni
Writers from La Paz